Way Back to the Bone is a compilation album by the band Trapeze of previously released material from 1970-1972. It features songs from the original line-up of Mel Galley, Glenn Hughes & Dave Holland.

Track listing

LP

Side one
 "Coast To Coast" – 4:02
 "Loser" – 4:45
 "Your Love Is Alright" – 4:54
 "Touch My Life" – 4:06
 "Way Back To The Bone" – 5:30

Side two
 "Seafull" – 6:34
 "Black Cloud" – 6:13
 "You Are The Music" – 5:21
 "Medusa" – 5:40

Personnel

 Dave Holland – Drums
 Glenn Hughes – Bass Guitar, Lead Vocals
 Mel Galley – Lead Guitar, Vocals

References

Trapeze (band) albums
1998 live albums